Drakies is a small housing estate on the outskirts of Inverness, Scotland, lying immediately south of the former Inverness-shire village of Culcabock. Both these areas are now suburbs of the city of Inverness.

Formerly farming land, Drakies was developed for private housing during the 1970s, and is also the location of the Police Headquarters of Northern Constabulary.

References

Areas of Inverness